Blunt Magazine is an online music magazine based in Australia. Previously based in print, the magazine is now predominantly online, with occasional physical releases. With historical covers featuring A Day to Remember, Bring Me the Horizon, Paramore, Green Day and Parkway Drive, the magazine is recognised as a significant publication in the international music industry.

History and profile
Blunt was founded in 1999. It was previously published by Next Media. and is a music magazine, written by seasoned music journalists.  The images found in Blunt Magazine are used from the contribution of various photographers and artists that work with the brand. The headquarters is in Sydney.

Mike Hohnen is the current head of operations of Blunt Magazine. The magazine, which had been on hiatus since 2016, was relaunched in its current online form in January 2020.

References

External links
Blunt Magazine online

1999 establishments in Australia
2016 disestablishments in Australia
Australian music websites
Defunct literary magazines published in Australia
Magazines established in 1999
Magazines disestablished in 2016
Magazines published in Sydney
Monthly magazines published in Australia
Online literary magazines
Online magazines with defunct print editions
Online music magazines published in Australia